Y Genedl Cymreig (established in 1877) was a weekly Welsh language newspaper containing general news and information. It was published by Thomas Jones.

References

Newspapers published in Wales
Newspapers established in 1877
1877 establishments in Wales